Narenj Bandben (also Romanized as Nārenj Bandben) is a village in Kelarabad Rural District, Kelarabad District, Abbasabad County, Mazandaran Province, Iran. At the 2006 census, its population was 180, in 49 families.

References 

Populated places in Abbasabad County